Pontastacus is a genus of freshwater crayfish occurring in eastern Europe and western Asia.

Classification and phylogeny
Pontastacus belongs to the family Astacidae, one of the three families of Northern Hemisphere freshwater crayfish within the superfamily Astacoidea. The internal phylogeny of Astacidae can be shown in the cladogram below:

Species
Nine species are recognized:
Pontastacus cubanicus (Birstein & Vinogradov, 1934) - Black Sea, Russia
Pontastacus danubialis Brodsky, 1981 - Danube Delta lakes, Ukraine
Pontastacus daucinus Brodsky, 1981 - Danube Delta lakes, Ukraine and Moldova
Pontastacus eichwaldi (Bott, 1950) - Caspian Sea
Pontastacus kessleri (Schimkewitsch, 1886) - Turkestan
Pontastacus leptodactylus (Eschscholtz, 1823) - around the Black Sea, in Crimea, Russia, and Turkey - "Turkish crayfish"
Pontastacus pachypus (Rathke, 1837) - Caspian Sea, Black Sea, Sea of Azov - "Caspian crayfish"
Pontastacus pylzowi (Skorikov, 1907) - eastern part of Transcaucasia
Pontastacus salinus (von Nordmann, 1842) - Black Sea

References

Astacidae
Crustacean genera
Crustaceans of Europe
Crustaceans of Asia